Phenacovolva lahainaensis is a species of sea snail, a marine gastropod mollusc in the family Ovulidae, the ovulids, cowry allies or false cowries. It was originally discovered alive on black coral on the coast of the island of Maui.

References

Ovulidae
Gastropods described in 1969